Kenneth Michael Kuzyk (born August 11, 1953) is a Canadian former professional ice hockey forward who played 41 games in the National Hockey League (NHL) for the Cleveland Barons. As a youth, he played in the 1966 Quebec International Pee-Wee Hockey Tournament with the Toronto Shopsy's minor ice hockey team.

Career statistics

Regular season and playoffs

References

External links
 

1953 births
Living people
Baltimore Clippers (1979–81) players
Binghamton Dusters players
Boston University Terriers men's ice hockey players
Canadian ice hockey forwards
Cincinnati Stingers (CHL) players
Cleveland Barons (NHL) players
Krefeld Pinguine players
Oklahoma City Stars players
Phoenix Roadrunners (CHL) players
Salt Lake Golden Eagles (CHL) players
Ice hockey people from Toronto
Tulsa Oilers (1964–1984) players
Undrafted National Hockey League players